Hit n Run Phase One is the thirty-eighth and penultimate studio album by American recording artist Prince. It was first released exclusively on the Tidal streaming service on September 7, 2015 before being released on CD on September 15, 2015 by NPG Records.

The title was originally reported to be The Hit & Run Album but was confirmed by Prince's publicists as Hit n Run Phase One.

Critical reception 

Hit n Run Phase One received mixed reviews from music critics. At Metacritic, which assigns a normalized rating out of 100 to reviews from mainstream critics, the album received an average score of 53, based on 16 reviews.

Track listing

Notes
"1000's of X's & O's" is listed as "1000 X's & O's" on the CD edition.

Charts

Weekly charts

Year-end charts

Release history

References

2015 albums
Albums produced by Prince (musician)
NPG Records albums
Prince (musician) albums